Bristol City Council is the local authority of Bristol, England. The council is a unitary authority, and is unusual in the United Kingdom in that its executive function is controlled by its directly elected mayor. Bristol has 34 wards, electing a total of 70 councillors.

History

The council was formed by the Local Government Act 1972. It was first elected in 1973, a year before formally coming into its powers and prior to the creation of the non-metropolitan district of Bristol on 1 April 1974.

Under the Local Government Act 1972 Bristol as a non-metropolitan district council would share power with the Avon County Council. This arrangement lasted until 1996 when Avon County Council was abolished and Bristol City Council gained responsibility for services that had been provided by the county council.

Political composition

Mayor

The mayor of Bristol following the 2021 mayoral election is Marvin Rees for the Labour Party. Originally intended to serve for four years from 2016, his first term was extended by a year due to the COVID-19 pandemic. He was re-elected for a shortened three-year term in 2021.

Rees had previously ran in the first Bristol mayoral election, coming second place to the independent George Ferguson.

On 7 December 2021, the majority of opposition councillors backed a legally binding motion to hold a referendum on the future of the role of the Elected Mayor of Bristol. The referendum on in May 2022 offered Bristolians the choice of keeping an elected mayor or reverting to a committee system of governance. The result was to abolish the role of mayor from May 2024.

Councillors
Following the 2021 Bristol City Council election, no party held a majority in the chamber, with both the Green Party and Labour holding the same number of seats. The council had previously been controlled by the Labour Party since 2016, and the council continues to be led by the directly-elected executive Mayor.

The Liberal Democrats gained eight seats in the election. However, on 13 December 2021, former Lord Mayor Chris Davies and former Lib Dem Bristol group leader Gary Hopkins defected from the party to form the Knowle Community Party.

On 24 December 2021, the Labour councillor for Southmead, Helen Godwin, announced she would be resigning, triggering a by-election for 17 February 2022, at which Kye Dudd (former councillor for Central until May 2021) of the Labour Party was elected to replace her.

The Green Party became the largest party in 2023 following the Hotwells and Harbourside by-election, gaining a seat from the Liberal Democrats.

Cabinet

The cabinet is led by Mayor Marvin Rees and currently consists of nine members (including Rees). All cabinet members are currently part of the Labour Party despite them being the second biggest party.

Bristol City Youth Council 
The Bristol City Youth Council (BCYC) are an elected group of young people aged 11 to 18. Members are voted for in the Bristol Big Youth Vote, which takes place in schools, with students voting. The constituencies for Youth Council are divided into Bristol North, Bristol East Central, and Bristol South, with each area having eight members. This is in addition to several co-optees from special representation groups such as Young Carers, Unity Youth, and the Children in Care Council.

The purpose of the Youth Council is express young people's views on the decisions that are important to them and that their opinions are voiced and heard. They also run internal and external campaigns

The Youth Council also internally elects two members of youth parliament (MYP), and two youth mayors. The youth mayors act as advisors to the mayor, Marvin Rees, and attend meetings and accompany him to events. As of February 2023, the Youth Mayors are Mya Parker and Felix Massey.

See also
Bristol City Council elections
History of Bristol City Council
Politics of Bristol

References

External links
 

Unitary authority councils of England
Local education authorities in England
Local authorities in Bristol
Billing authorities in England
Local government in Bristol
Mayor and cabinet executives
1974 establishments in England
Government agencies established in 1974